Sven Fredrik Lidman (December 11, 1786 – March 9, 1845) was a Swedish priest.

Lidman was born in Norrköping, Sweden and received a PhD from Uppsala University in 1806 and became an ordained priest in the Evangelical-Lutheran state church of Sweden in 1811. From 1811 to 1817 he served as a preacher at the Swedish legation in Constantinople (now Istanbul). In 1817, he obtained a teaching position in Linköping, where he was appointed cathedral dean (domprost) in 1824. He represented the diocese of Linköping in the parliament.

He died in 1845 in Linköping and is interred in the family grave in the southeast corner of Linköping city cemetery.

Lidman was a member of the Geatish Society, using the pseudonym Sigurd Jorsalefarer.

References

1786 births
1845 deaths
People from Norrköping
19th-century Swedish Lutheran priests